Adrían Víctor Hugo Islas Hernández (born 8 September 1951) is a Mexican lawyer and politician affiliated with the Institutional Revolutionary Party. As of 2014 he served as Deputy of the LIII, LVI and LXI Legislatures of the Mexican Congress and as Senator of the LVII Legislature representing Puebla.

References

1951 births
Living people
People from Puebla (city)
Members of the Senate of the Republic (Mexico)
Members of the Chamber of Deputies (Mexico)
Institutional Revolutionary Party politicians
20th-century Mexican lawyers
21st-century Mexican lawyers